An elective monarchy is a monarchy ruled by an elected monarch, in contrast to a hereditary monarchy in which the office is automatically passed down as a family inheritance. The manner of election, the nature of candidate qualifications, and the electors vary from case to case. Historically, it was common for elective monarchies to transform into hereditary ones over time or for hereditary ones to acquire at least occasional elective aspects.

Evolution
Many, if not most, kingdoms were officially elective historically, though the candidates were typically only from the family of the deceased monarch. Eventually, however, most elected monarchies introduced hereditary succession, guaranteeing that the title and office stayed within the royal family and specifying, more or less precisely, the order of succession.
Today, almost all monarchies are hereditary monarchies in which the monarchs come from one royal family with the office of sovereign being passed from one family member to another upon the death or abdication of the incumbent.

Historical examples

Europe

Ancient Greece
The kings of Macedon and of Epirus were elected by the army, which was similar in composition to the Ecclesia of the Demos, the assembly of all free Athenian citizens. Military service often was linked with citizenship among the male members of the royal house.

Ancient Rome and Byzantium
In the ancient Roman Kingdom the kings were elected by the Roman assemblies. Once the Roman kings were overthrown, there remained an absolute prohibition for royal establishment in the Roman constitution, a prohibition which formally remained in place during imperial times, both classical Roman and Byzantine. In practice, however, Imperial Rome was a monarchy. During the Principate (27 BCE to 284 CE), which was the foundational stage of Roman imperialism, Roman monarchs would often take care to disguise their de facto position with the de jure apparatus of republicanism.  This was particularly the case for Augustus, the first Emperor, who established the Principate. Whilst given many titles (including "Augustus", i.e. "majestic") he described himself as princeps senatus, or merely "first among senators". The illusion of being elected from the Senate continued when Tiberius succeeded to the purple. Over time the principle weakened as republican government passed into distant history, and the Empire became functionally an absolute monarchy. The office of Roman and Byzantine emperor remained vaguely elective (albeit with the election procedure never strictly defined, but generally understood to be a matter for the Senate). For instance, whilst the first five Emperors were all descended from Julius Caesar, in each case their position was proclaimed, not inherited as of right. Claudius, the fourth Emperor, in particular stands out, being "elected" to office once the Praetorian Guard had made it clear he was their candidate.

Accordingly, heredity never was, and could never be, formally established in law. And whilst the later, more overtly authoritarian Dominate period further stripped the republican veneer from the constitution, Emperors succeeded by a mixture of proclamation by the Legions or Senate as much as by blood (though sons did succeed fathers).

In order to bypass the prohibition on heredity and ensure dynastic continuity, many reigning Byzantine emperors had their heirs crowned co-emperor so that the throne could not be considered vacant at their own death and thus the need for succession by election would not arise.

Britain
A system of elective monarchy existed in Anglo-Saxon England (see Witenagemot).

John of England was chosen as King of England by a council of nobles and royal advisors at the death of his brother, Richard I, in 1199 because the heir by strict primogeniture, Arthur of Brittany, was a child at that time. This affirmed the principle of elective monarchy.

In 14th, 15th, late 17th and early 18th century England, Parliament effectively asserted that monarchy in England was elective in principle – at least as between various contenders with some dynastic claim for the throne. Henry IV of England was chosen by Parliament in 1399 to replace Richard II. Richard was childless, and the Earl of March, the next in line to the throne, was a young child at the time, so Parliament bypassed him in favour of Henry, who had led a revolt against Richard. Parliament also confirmed depositions during the Wars of the Roses, as well as Henry VIII's settlements of the crown. During the Exclusion Crisis, King Charles II strongly opposed any such idea.

Following the Glorious Revolution, Parliament enacted the Act of Succession, whose effect was to disinherit the Stuarts and replace them by the Hanoverians, whose dynastic claim was far more remote. William III and Mary II, were chosen by Parliament to replace James II. (Mary was James' daughter, William was James' nephew, and William and Mary were succeeded by Mary's younger sister Anne.) Parliament passed laws in the late 17th and early 18th centuries which explicitly excluded Catholics (and thus the male descendants of James II) from the order of succession. The Succession to the Crown Act 2013, replaced male-preference primogeniture with absolute primogeniture and ended disqualification of a person who married a Roman Catholic from succession.

In Scotland, the Declaration of Arbroath of 1320 asserted the rights of the nobles to choose a king if required, which implied elective monarchy. Tanistry was also the system of royal succession until King Malcolm II in the early 11th century introduced direct inheritance. The Isle of Man also used tanistry.

Ireland

In Ireland, from the beginning of recorded history until the mid-16th/early 17th century, succession was determined by an elective system based on patrilineal relationship known as tanistry.

Dutch Republic
In the Dutch Republic of the 17th and 18th centuries there was the office of the Stadtholder, whose powers fell short of those of a monarch, and which was elective. Each of the seven Dutch provinces could separately elect its own Stadtholder, and it did not have to be the same person in all of them. In theory anyone could be elected Stadtholder, though in practice it was restricted to members of the House of Orange. There was no obligation to elect a Stadtholder at all, and the leaders of the Dutch Republican faction, such as Oldenbarnevelt and De Witt, repeatedly tried to abolish the office of Stadtholder or leave it vacant – which it was for several decades of Dutch history. Conversely, the House of Orange and its adherents tried to increase the powers of the Stadtholder to approximate those of a monarch, to make it officially hereditary (which it became in the later part of the 18th century) and finally to transform it into a full-fledged monarchy – as it was in 1815.

Gaul/France
The Gallic tribes were each ruled by a rix, which can be translated as king, who were elected for terms of one year or longer. Candidates were drawn from relatives of past kings.

The Frankish kingdom was at least partly elective. Merovingian kings were elected, while Carolingian kings were elected at times. In the 10th century Western Frankish royal elections switched between different lineages before settling on the Capetians. Medieval France was an elective monarchy at the time of the first Capetian kings; the kings however took the habit of, during their reign, having their son elected as successor. The election soon became a mere formality and vanished after the reign of Philip II. 

After declaring the throne vacant, the French Chamber of Deputies voted 229–33 to declare Louis-Philippe of France as King of the French during the July Revolution of 1830, creating an elective monarchy. France briefly had again a kind of elective monarchy when Napoleon III was first elected President of France and then transformed himself into an Emperor – which, him being the nephew of the Emperor Napoleon I, was not entirely a surprise.

Holy Roman Empire

The Holy Roman Empire, beginning with its predecessor Eastern Francia, is perhaps the best-known example of an elective monarchy. However, from 1440 to 1740, a Habsburg was always elected emperor, the throne becoming unofficially hereditary. During that period, the emperor was elected from within the House of Habsburg by a small council of nobles called prince-electors. The secular electoral seats were hereditary.  However, spiritual electors (and other prince-(arch)bishops) were usually elected by the cathedral chapters as religious leaders, but simultaneously ruled as monarch (prince) of a territory of imperial immediacy (which usually comprised a part of their diocesan territory). Thus the prince-bishoprics were elective monarchies too. The same holds true for prince-abbacies, whose princess-abbesses or prince-abbots were elected by a college of clerics and imperially appointed as princely rulers in a pertaining territory.

Bohemia
Since medieval times, the King of Bohemia was elected by the Estates of Lands of the Bohemian Crown. Since 1526, when Ferdinand I assumed the Bohemian Crown, it was always held by the Habsburg branch who later became Holy Roman Emperor and who expected this situation to go on indefinitely. In 1618 the Bohemians chose to exercise in practice their legal right to choose a King at their discretion, and bestowed the Bohemian Crown on Frederick V, Elector Palatine – "The Winter King". However, the Habsburgs regarded this as an act of rebellion, imposed their rule over Bohemia in the Battle of the White Mountain and in the aftermath abolished the Bohemian Elective Monarchy and made exclusive Habsburg rule the de jure as well as de facto situation. The attempt to make Frederick V King of Bohemia is regarded as a catalyst for the Thirty Years War.

Hungary
Hungary was an elective monarchy until 1687. This elective right carried on for another two more decades in the Principality of Transylvania which de jure continued to belong to the Lands of the Hungarian Crown but had split from Hungary when the childless King Louis II died after the Battle of Mohács.

Iberia
Visigothic Hispania elected the king from the relatives of past kings, in accordance with the Germanic traditions.

The Kingship of Aragon was initially elected by the "rich men" barons. Later this right was limited to the Cortes confirming the succession of the heir.

During the 19th century, more precisely between 1870 and 1873, an attempt of such a system took place in Spain. After the Glorious Revolution and Isabella II's subsequent deposition in 1868 a new parliament was constituted through direct male suffrage. It was then decided that a democratically elected monarch was needed in Spain. The debates regarding Isabella I's succession took place until October 1869, when Amadeo I was finally chosen. Nevertheless, his reign lasted until 11 October 1873, when he abdicated citing his inability to solve the problems Spain was going through, after which the parliament proclaimed a republic.

Portugal's monarchy contained the remnants of the elective principle in requiring reciprocal oaths, the assent of the Cortes and acclamation before acceding to the throne. The Cortes affirmed the crown as elective when it elevated King John in 1385. In Portugal, on 6 April 1385 in the aftermath of 1383–1385 Crisis, the Council of the Kingdom elected John I, then Master of the Order of Aviz, as King of Portugal. His half-brother Ferdinand I had died without a male heir in October 1383, and different factions made strenuous efforts to secure the throne for Princess Beatrice, Ferdinand's only daughter and Queen consort of Castile and León, or for either of her uncles Infante John, Duke of Valencia de Campos and Infante Denis, Lord of Cifuentes. The Council elected instead the younger (and illegitimate) son of Peter I, thus avoiding a jure uxoris Castilian king.

Kingdom of Jerusalem
In the Crusader Kingdom of Jerusalem, the kingship was partially elected and partially hereditary. During the height of the kingdom in the mid-12th century there was a royal family and a relatively clear line of succession. Nevertheless, the king was elected, or at least recognized, by the Haute Cour. Here the king was considered a primus inter pares (first among equals), and in his absence his duties were performed by his seneschal.

Polish-Lithuanian Commonwealth

The tradition of electing the country's ruler, which occurred when there was no clear heir to the throne, dates to the very beginning of Polish statehood. The election privilege, exercised during the gatherings known as wiec, was usually limited to the most powerful nobles (magnates) or officials, and was heavily influenced by local traditions and strength of the ruler.

In Poland, after the death of the last Piast in 1370, Polish kings were initially elected by a small council; gradually, this privilege was granted to all members of the szlachta (Polish nobility). Kings of Poland and Grand Dukes of Lithuania during the times of the Polish–Lithuanian Commonwealth (1569–1795) were elected by gatherings of crowds of nobles at a field in Wola, today a district in Warsaw. Since in Poland, all sons of a noble were nobles, and not only the eldest, every one of an estimated 500,000 nobles could potentially have participated in such elections in person – by far the most extensive franchise of any European country at the time. During the election period, the function of the king was performed by an interrex (usually in the person of the primate of Poland). This unique Polish election was termed the free election (wolna elekcja). Although the elective principle was already established in Polish political culture in the late Middle Ages, the rules changed significantly in the 1570s, and the principles developed in that period lasted until the Partitions of Poland. There have been thirteen royal elections in Poland–Lithuania from 1573 to 1764. Roșu (2017) marked the 1575/1576 Polish–Lithuanian royal election as the most significant for several reasons. First, 'the citizens of the commonwealth were forced to de facto depose their first elected king – thus applying the right of disobedience they had inscribed in their public records only two years before.' Second, it resulted in two candidates being proclaimed the winner, and in subsequent events the nobility was able to confirm their majority choice for Stephen Báthory and have it recognised, while avoiding war with Maximilian II of Habsburg.

Scandinavia
Scandinavian kingship, according to the Germanic tradition, was elected upon the death of the previous king. The selection was not always limited to the heirs of the previous king (e.g. in Sweden when the royal house was changing between the houses of Eric and Sverker between generations). Originally, kings were supposed to be elected from among the descendants of a previous king, which was connected to descent from gods. There could also be joint rule between multiple kings. Disputed succession was common because of a large number of sons sired by kings. However when single rule appeared in the 9th century, civil wars grew in frequency throughout the region. Later, Christianisation led to the promulgation of primogeniture in Norway in 1163 and Denmark in 1170, but the elective idea still persisted in the requirement to be certified by a local assembly and subsequently the magnates would still elect the new king, albeit while the incumbent king was still alive. This demonstrated the enduring power of the nobles.

Originally, the Kings of Sweden were elected by all free men at the Mora Thing. Elective monarchy continued until 1544, when the Riksdag of the Estates designated the heirs of King Gustav Vasa as the heirs to the throne. The Danish monarchy was also officially elective, although the eldest son of the reigning monarch was usually elected. This continued until 1660, when a hereditary and absolute monarchy was instituted by Frederick III. Though the monarchy of Norway was originally hereditary, it too became elective in the twelfth and thirteenth centuries. Candidates had to be of royal blood, but the kingship was elected by a council of noblemen, rather than automatically passing to the eldest son. In 1905 Prince Carl was elected King of Norway, after the male population in the 1905 Norwegian monarchy referendum decided Norway should still be a monarchy.

The Scandinavian kingdoms were united under the Danish crown by Margaret I of Denmark in 1389, but many of her successors had the united kingdoms split up as Sweden elected a different king than Denmark and Norway upon succession. The election was usually contested through a Danish invasion of Sweden until Christian II of Denmark after his reconquest of Sweden had many of those voting against him executed in the Stockholm Bloodbath (1520), which ended much of the support for the Danish king on the Swedish throne.

In 1810, the Swedish Riksdag elected the French Marshall and Prince of Pontecorvo Jean Bernadotte to be the new Crown Prince, since it was apparent that the Swedish branch of the House of Holstein-Gottorp would die with the childless King Charles XIII. Bernadotte eventually ascended the throne as Charles XIV John of Sweden and founded the still current House of Bernadotte. In this case the elective aspect in the choice of Monarch was especially prominent, since Bernadotte had been a French commoner with no previous connection to Sweden and not the most remote of dynastic claims to the Swedish throne – his being chosen derived solely from urgent political and military considerations of the crisis time of the Napoleonic Wars.

Sovereign Military Order of Malta
The Sovereign Military Order of Malta, formerly known as the Knights Hospitaller or the Knights of Malta, remains a sovereign subject of international law since it was exiled to Rome from Malta during the French occupation of Malta under the First French Republic. The Order is ruled by the Prince and Grand Master, who is elected for life by the Council Complete of State. The Prince and Grand Master holds the rank of Prince, bestowed by the Holy Roman Emperor in 1607 and holds the precedence of a cardinal of the Church since 1630. The Council that elects the prince includes members of the Sovereign Council and other high-ranking office-holders and representatives of the Order's worldwide entities. The Sovereign Council, including the Grand Commander, the Grand Chancellor, the Grand Hospitaller, and the Receiver of the Common Treasure, aid the prince in governing the order.

Venice
The Republic of Venice was ruled from 697 to 1797 by a doge, who normally ruled for life, though a few were forced from office. His powers were never those of an absolute monarch, but he was the Republic's highest official and powerful within restrictions and levels of oversight that varied in different periods. The election process began with the Great Council of more than 2000 Venetian aristocrats and employed an elaborate system designed to prevent one family or alliance from dominating the process. It used smaller nominating groups that were reduced in number by the drawing of lots and required a supermajority for election.

Africa
The Kingdom of Algiers (from the seventeenth century to the nineteenth century) was an elective monarchy, whose dey was elected, depending on the period, by the Divan of Algiers or by the Taïfa of the raïs (Assembly of the corsairs). The elected deys also bore the title of governor-sultan of Algiers or sultan of Algiers.

Mali Empire
In Africa, the Mali Empire functioned as both a constitutional and elective monarchy. The mansa, or emperor, had to be approved by the Great Assembly known as the Gbara, despite hereditary claims.

Kongo
The Kingdom of Kongo was a purer example of an elective monarchy, where blood claims had even less influence.  Nobles elected a king's successor, and it was common for the successor to be of a different family as his predecessor.

This form of elective monarchy existed in the kingdom from its inception in around 1400 until its complete disintegration in the early 20th century.

West Africa
In the pre-colonial period, a number of West African rulers, such as the kings and chieftains of the Ashanti Empire and those of Ife and the Oyo Empire, were elected from amongst the various royal families of their polities by colleges of noblemen known as kingmakers. This practice has continued to the present day.

Asia

Afghanistan

In Afghanistan,  jirgas have been reportedly organized since at least the early 18th century when the Hotaki and Durrani dynasties rose to power.
There is a myth in the sense that the ancient Aryan tribes, who are hypothesized to have spoken Proto-Indo-Iranian, came down in intermittent waves from Central Asia and Afghanistan. The  (summit) comprised elders and tribal chiefs. In India they are referred to as Samiti and Sabha.

Iran
The Parthian Empire (248 BCE–224 CE), also known as the Arsacid Empire, is considered to be the oldest elective monarchy in the Asia. The King of Kings has been required to undergo an assembly of the nobles called Mahestān, as a vote of approval before being allowed to ascend to the imperial throne or to be removed from the power.

Other monarchs, such as the former Shah of Iran, have been required to undergo a parliamentary vote of approval before being allowed to ascend to the throne.

Mongol Empire
In the Mongol Empire, the Great Khan was chosen by the Kurultai. This was often convened in the capital. Other critical leadership positions were also assigned.

Korea
The ancient Korean kingdom of Silla elected its first king by a conference of tribal and village elders in 57 BC. Unified Silla's kings were elected by the aristocracy whose powers were on par with the king. In the kingdom of Goguryeo, the ruler was originally chosen from among the heads of the five tribes, most often the Sono tribe.

Oceania
In 1858, several central Māori tribes of the North Island of New Zealand elected Pōtatau Te Wherowhero as their monarch. The Tainui tribal elders have continued this tradition and the Kiingitanga movement alive to the present. The present Māori King (i.e. monarch of the Kiingitanga movement, not of all Māori) is Tūheitia Potatau Te Wherowhero VII, eldest son of the previous Māori monarch Te Arikinui Dame Te Atairangikaahu. He was sworn in on 21 August 2006 on the day of his mother's funeral. While in principal the position is not hereditary, in practice every Māori monarch thus far has been the heir of the previous monarch.

The Hawaiian Kingdom could be considered a de facto example. From 1864 until the monarchy was overthrown in 1893, it was constitutionally a hereditary monarchy utilizing male-preference primogeniture. However, the Constitutions of 1864 and 1887, and the draft constitution of 1893, all provided that, in the event of the extinction of the royal line, the Legislature would elect a "native aliʻi" as the new monarch and stirps of a new dynasty. In practice, however, during the entire time from 1864 until the abolition of the monarchy, the throne was never passed from parent to child, as every Hawaiian monarch who reigned during that period died without leaving issue. Following the 1872 death of King Kamehameha V, a non-binding referendum was held, in which William Charles Lunalilo won; he was subsequently elected king by the legislature in 1873. King Kalākaua was elected by the legislature in 1874, after Lunalilo's death. However, when Kalākaua died in 1891, the crown demised to the collateral line of his sister, Queen Liliʻuokalani. Prior to 1864, the Hawaiian King-in-Council appointed the heir to the Hawaiian throne.

The Americas

Mexico
The Tlatoanimeh of the Aztec Empire were chosen by a council of elders, nobles, and priests. He would be selected from a pool of four candidates.

Costa Rica
The mánkeme (king) of the Kingdom of Nicoya was elected by a council of elders known as the monéxico.

Chile and Argentina

French explorer Orélie-Antoine de Tounens claimed to be elected by the Mapuche to be the Great Toqui, Supreme Chieftain of the Mapuches, possibly in the belief that their cause might be better served with a European acting on their behalf. He later proclaimed himself as the King of Araucanía and Patagonia.

United States
An attempt to create an elective monarchy in the United States failed. Alexander Hamilton argued in a long speech before the Constitutional Convention of 1787 that the President of the United States should be an elective monarch, ruling for "good behavior" (i.e., for life, unless impeached) and with extensive powers. Hamilton believed that elective monarchs had sufficient power domestically to resist foreign corruption, yet there was enough domestic control over their behavior to prevent tyranny at home. His proposal was resoundingly voted down in favor of a four-year term with the possibility of reelection. In his later defense of the Constitution in The Federalist Papers, he often hints that a lifetime executive might be better, even as he praises the system with the four-year term.

Haiti
The crown of the Empire of Haiti, established in 1804, was also elective according to its 1805 constitution.

Extraordinary election 
A hereditary monarchy may occasionally use election to fill a vacant throne. For example, the royal family may become extinct; depending on how precisely the succession to the throne is defined in law, several candidates with equally, or almost equally, strong claims could emerge, with an election being held to choose from among them. This differs from a formally elective monarchy in that it is an extraordinary measure, and with the new monarch the succession again becomes hereditary.

Alternatively, the monarch may be deposed, as in a revolution. While sometimes a monarch may be forced to abdicate in favour of his or her heir, on other occasions the royal family as a whole has been rejected, the throne going to an elected candidate. Examples of extraordinary election are:
 Michael of Russia, chosen by a Zemsky Sobor (national assembly) in 1613 after the extinction of the Rurikid dynasty and the end of the Time of Troubles. The resulting Romanov dynasty was an old boyar house with close ties to the former royal family, and Michael's father, Feodor Romanov, was at the time a Patriarch of Moscow and All Russia under the monastic name of Filaret, in effect holding a position of interrex. Later, Patriarch Filaret, a skilled politician in his own right, became effectively a co-ruler and sometimes a regent for his weak and not very healthy son.
 In 1971 seven individual Emirates in the Arabian Peninsula united to form the United Arab Emirates and became a federation. Upon its formation, Sheikh Zayed bin Sultan Al Nahyan of Abu Dhabi was elected as the head of the state and Ra'is (President) of the union by the ruling monarchs of the other six Emirates, while Zayed himself voted for Rashid bin Saeed Al Maktoum, then ruler of Dubai.
Gopala, the first emperor of the Pala Empire, was chosen by independent regional warchiefs in the 8th century. This arrangement was common in many contemporary tribal societies in the region.

Invitation 
Before republics became widespread or default form of modern government, back when many states operated as monarchies by default, new polities or countries in internal turmoil sometimes selected and invited some person to become their monarch. The selected person might have had little or nothing to do with his prospective kingdom; he might have had associations with a current great power or with a current regional power, or might appear as a true outsider, (hopefully) unbiased in matters of internal politics. (The concept of "invitation" may discreetly gloss over intense lobbying or diplomatic maneuvering in some cases.) By selecting a foreign prince or aristocrat, nations could expect to gain diplomatic links and a figurehead accustomed to the trappings of courts and ceremonial duties. Newly established states in the 19th and early 20th centuries established trends in the selection and appointment of newly minted monarchs.

At the start of the 20th century, the first monarchs of several newly independent nations were elected by parliaments: Norway is the prime example. Previously, following precedent set in newly independent Greece, new nations without a well-established hereditary royal family often chose their own monarchs from among the established royal families of Europe, rather than elevate a member of the local power establishment, in the hope that a stable hereditary monarchy would eventually emerge from the process. The first king of Belgium, as well as the now-deposed royal families of Greece, Bulgaria, Albania (unsuccessfully) and Romania, were originally appointed in this manner. On 9 October 1918 the Parliament of newly independent Finland elected Prince Frederick Charles of Hesse, brother-in-law of the German Emperor Wilhelm II, as King of Finland – but soon afterwards, this move was foiled by the German defeat in WWI and the demise of Monarchy in Germany itself, and Finland opted to become a Republic instead.

Examples include:

 862: According to tradition, various tribes of northern Rus' invited Rurik, a chief of their former Varangian foes, to re-establish order: his descendants ruled in Kiev, Muscovy and Russia until 1612. The legend of an invitation echoes the habit of later invitations to Rurikids and others to rule in Pskov and in Novgorod.
 1573: The Polish szlachta broke with tradition by looking beyond Central Europe for a candidate and electing the French Prince Henry, Duke of Anjou as King of Poland.
 1810: Sweden elected the French Napoleonic Marshal Jean Bernadotte as Crown Prince: he became King Charles XIV John of Sweden in 1818.
 1831: Belgium selected a German Prince of Saxe-Coburg-Gotha as King Leopold I, the first King of the Belgians.
 1832: European Great Power diplomats selected the German Prince Otto of Bavaria to become King Otto of Greece.
 1863: The Greek National Assembly elected the Danish Prince William of Schleswig-Holstein-Sonderburg-Glücksburg as King George I of the Hellenes.
 1863: The Conservative Party of Mexico offered the crown of the Second Mexican Empire to Maximilian, younger brother of Emperor Franz Joseph I of Austria.

 1866: Romania elected the German Prince Karl of Hohenzollern-Sigmaringen as its Ruling Prince (he later became King Carol I of Romania).
 1870: In the wake of political turmoil in Spain, the Spanish Cortes re-established the Spanish monarchy under a new royal house, electing the Italian Prince Amedeo of Savoy as King Amadeo I of Spain.
 1879: The Bulgarian Grand National Assembly elected the Russian-sponsored German Prince Alexander of Battenberg as its reigning knyaz (prince).
 1887: The Bulgarian Grand National Assembly elected the Austro-Hungarian Prince Ferdinand of Saxe-Coburg and Gotha-Koháry as Prince (later Tsar) of Bulgaria.
 1905: Norway, newly independent of Sweden, elected Prince Carl of Denmark as its first modern independent monarch: Haakon VII of Norway
 1914: The European powers selected the German Prince William of Wied as the ruler of the Principality of Albania.
 1918: The German-occupied Kingdom of Lithuania voted to offer the throne to the German Prince Wilhelm of Urach, Count of Württemberg, 2nd Duke of Urach, who would have become King Mindaugas II.
 1918: Frederick Charles Louis Constantine, Prince and Landgrave of Hesse, was elected to be King of Finland by the Finnish Parliament, but never reigned and abdicated on December 14 the same year.

Current elective monarchies
Currently, the world's only true elective monarchies are:

Cambodia 
The king is chosen for a life term by the Royal Council of the Throne from candidates of royal blood.

Holy See 
In The Holy See and the associated Vatican City State, the Pope is elected in a conclave by the College of Cardinals, generally from among their number.

Malaysia
 
The Yang di-Pertuan Agong (Supreme Head of State) is elected to a five-year term. Nine hereditary rulers from the Malay States form a Council of Rulers who will determine the next Agong via a secret ballot. The position has to date been de facto rotated amongst the State rulers, originally based on seniority. The Yang di-Pertuan Agong shall not be re-elected unless the rotation succession was complete.

Additionally, the Malaysian state of Negeri Sembilan is itself an elective monarchy, where the Yang di-Pertuan Besar of Negeri Sembilan is selected by a council of ruling chiefs. The ruling chiefs themselves are elected by the chieftain. Male candidates are determined based on matrilineal clan due to the influence of Minangkabau culture. The system was partially the basis for the federal monarchy.

The Sultan of Perak is selected from amongst the most senior male princes descending from the 18th Sultan of Perak, Sultan Ahmadin. The Sultan, Raja Muda (Crown Prince), and Raja Di-Hilir (Deputy Crown Prince) are selected by the Dewan Negara of Perak. A son of the reigning Sultan cannot become Raja Muda if there is a more senior prince descended from the previous Sultan; this is possible should the senior prince relinquish his right to become Raja Muda.

United Arab Emirates 
The president is elected by the Federal Supreme Council with a term of five years. Since its formation, the position has been a de facto hereditary position to the Al Nahyan sheikhs of Abu Dhabi by consensus of the Federal Supreme Council. Likewise, the Vice President and Prime Minister of the UAE is a position held by the Al Maktoum sheikhs of Dubai. Elections are held every 5 years. The position of the ruler of each emirate of the United Arab Emirates is determined by consensus of the respective ruling royal family of that emirate.

Similar forms
 Andorra can be considered a semi-elective principality. Andorra's two heads of state are Spain's Bishop of La Seu d'Urgell and the Count of Foix. The title of Count was merged with the French crown in 1609, meaning that all French kings from then on became Co-Prince. France relinquished control upon the formation of the First Republic, briefly leaving Andorra under a clerical monarchy, but Napoleon reclaimed the seat. Since Napoleon III's deposition and the formation of the French Third Republic, the French co-prince of Andorra has been the (now democratically elected) President of France, as they are considered the unofficial successor of the Counts of Foix. The Andorran authorities and people have no say in the election of the President of France, leaving Andorra in the unique position of having a monarch who is democratically elected by the citizenry of another state.
 Eswatini has a form of quasi-elective monarchy. No king can appoint his successor. Instead, the royal family decides which of his wives shall be "Great Wife" and "Indlovukazi" (She-Elephant / Queen Mother). The son of this "Great Wife" will automatically become the next king. The eldest son is never appointed successor, as he has other ceremonial roles.
 Nigeria has a system whereby Nigerian traditional rulers (or "royal fathers", e.g. the Obas, Ezes and Emirs) are usually elected by councils of kingmakers from almost endless pools of contending cousins who are eligible for the elections because they all claim descent from founding monarchs or other royals. Each title is therefore held for life by one of these dynastic cousins in turn, often through rotation.
 The cacique of the Ngöbe people of Costa Rica and Panama is appointed for life by a council of 13 elders. The latest election was in 2013 after the death of the previous cacique at around 100 years old. The current cacique is Costa Rican-born Pedro Palacios, son of the previous cacique Pedro Bejarano.
While Samoa has been a parliamentary republic since independence in 1962, it was commonly mistaken for an elective monarchy for most of its existence. The Constitution of Samoa provides that the Head of State be elected for a five-year term by the Fono, the Samoan parliament. Articles 18 and 45 of the Constitution provide, respectively, that any Member of Parliament may be elected head of state, and that any Samoan citizen may be elected to Parliament, although 47 out of the 49 seats in the Fono are reserved for matai, or chiefs (the other two are reserved for non-Samoans). However, most of the confusion stemmed from a special clause which named Malietoa Tanumafili II and Tupua Tamasese Meaole, who were two of the four paramount chiefs (Tama-a-Aiga), as joint presidents for life, only reverting to the normal rule of electing the head of state for five years upon Malietoa's death in 2007. In addition, the Samoan head of state is referred to as "His Highness", and an unwritten constitutional convention dictates that the President be elected from among the four paramount chiefs.
 Saudi Arabia's throne, while hereditary, is not determined by a succession law but rather by consensus of the House of Saud as to who will be Crown Prince of Saudi Arabia; consensus may change depending on the Crown Prince's actions or influence, creating strong incentive for the Crown Prince to assert his power. Since 2007, the process of establishing the consensus of the House has been institutionalized in the form of the Allegiance Council, comprising the most powerful senior princes, which has the power to disapprove the King's nominee for Crown Prince and substitute its own by simple majority vote. In effect, this makes the Saudi monarchy elective within the House of Saud, as the king's eldest son has not become Crown Prince since the death of King Abdulaziz in 1953. However, it was only in 2015, through the accession of Muhammad bin Nayef, that a member of the house who was not a son of Abdulaziz attained the position (all prior Crown Princes had been chosen from among Abdulaziz's sons). Upon Prince Muhammad's removal, Prince Muhammad bin Salman became the first Crown Prince since Saud to hold the position during the reign of his father. 
 The Maori King Movement in New Zealand chooses a Maori monarch, elected by the kaumatua of various New Zealand iwi (tribes). However, every Maori monarch to date has been succeeded by their child, making the position hereditary in effect.
 Wallis and Futuna (territories of the French Republic) have traditional heads of the three regions who are elected.

See also
 Elective dictatorship
 President for life
 Tanistry

References

External links
 
 
 
 

 
Monarchy
Political systems